The That's My Kind of Night Tour was the second headlining concert tour by American country music artist Luke Bryan, in support of his fourth studio album Crash My Party (2013). It began on January 8, 2014 in Columbus, Ohio and finished on May 7, 2015 in Winnipeg, Manitoba. The tour is sponsored by Miller Lite, Texaco, and Cabela's.

Concert synopsis
At Stadiums and arenas the show begins with Bryan standing on a black truck with flames surrounding him while singing his hit "That's My Kind of Night".

Setlists
{{hidden
| headercss = background: #ccccff; font-size: 100%; width: 59%;
| contentcss = text-align: left; font-size: 100%; width: 75%;
| header = North America Leg 1 
| content = 
"That's My Kind of Night"
"Rain Is a Good Thing"
"Kiss Tomorrow Goodbye"
"All My Friends Say"
"Country Man"
"Someone Else Calling You Baby"
"Do I"
"Play It Again"
"Muckalee Creek Water"/"Drinkin' Beer and Wastin' Bullets"
"Suntan City"
"If You Ain't Here to Party"
"Can't Hold Us" 
"Crash My Party"
"Drink a Beer"
"Drunk on You"
"I Don't Want This Night to End" (mashed up with Taio Cruz's "Dynamite")
Encore
"The Only Way I Know"
"Country Girl (Shake It for Me)"
}}
{{hidden
| headercss = background: #ccccff; font-size: 100%; width: 59%;
| contentcss = text-align: left; font-size: 100%; width: 75%;
| header = North America Legs 2 & 3
| content = 
"That's My Kind of Night"
"Rain Is a Good Thing"
"Kiss Tomorrow Goodbye"
"All My Friends Say"
"Roller Coaster"
"Country Man"
"Someone Else Calling You Baby"
"Crazy Girl" 
"Shut It Down"
"Do I"
"This Is How We Roll" 
"Suntan City"
"Crash My Party"
"Drink a Beer"
"Drunk on You"
"I Don't Want This Night to End" (mashed up with Taio Cruz's "Dynamite")
Encore
"Play it Again"
"Country Girl (Shake It for Me)"
}}
{{hidden
| headercss = background: #ccccff; font-size: 100%; width: 59%;
| contentcss = text-align: left; font-size: 100%; width: 75%;
| header = Lincoln Financial Field
| content = 
"That's My Kind of Night"
"Rain Is a Good Thing"
"Kiss Tomorrow Goodbye"
"All My Friends Say"
"Roller Coaster"
"Country Man"
"Someone Else Calling You Baby"
"Crazy Girl" 
"Shut It Down"
"Do I"
"This Is How We Roll" 
"Dirt Road Anthem" 
"Suntan City"
"Crash My Party"
"Drink a Beer"
"Drunk on You"
"I Don't Want This Night to End" (mashed up with Taio Cruz's "Dynamite")
Encore
"Play It Again"
"Country Girl (Shake It for Me)"
}}
{{hidden
| headercss = background: #ccccff; font-size: 100%; width: 59%;
| contentcss = text-align: left; font-size: 100%; width: 75%;
| header = Gillette Stadium
| content = 
"That's My Kind of Night"
"Rain Is a Good Thing"
"Kiss Tomorrow Goodbye"
"All My Friends Say"
"Roller Coaster"
"Country Man"
"Someone Else Calling You Baby"
"Crazy Girl" 
"Shut It Down"
"This Is How We Roll" 
"The Only Way I Know" 
"Suntan City"
"How Am I Doin" 
"Crash My Party"
"Drink a Beer"
"Drunk on You"
"I Don't Want This Night to End" (mashed up with Taio Cruz's "Dynamite")
Encore
"Play It Again"
"Country Girl (Shake It for Me)"
}}
{{hidden
| headercss = background: #ccccff; font-size: 100%; width: 59%;
| contentcss = text-align: left; font-size: 100%; width: 75%;
| header = Soldier Field & Heinz Field
| content = 
"That's My Kind of Night"
"Rain Is a Good Thing"
"Kiss Tomorrow Goodbye"
"All My Friends Say"
"Roller Coaster"
"Country Man"
"Someone Else Calling You Baby"
"Crazy Girl" 
"Shut It Down"
"This Is How We Roll"
"Dust On The Battle" 
"Fishin In The Dark" 
"Suntan City"
"Crash My Party"
"Drink a Beer"
"Drunk on You"
"I Don't Want This Night to End" (mashed up with Taio Cruz's "Dynamite")
Encore
"Play It Again"
"Country Girl (Shake It for Me)"
}}
{{hidden
| headercss = background: #ccccff; font-size: 100%; width: 59%;
| contentcss = text-align: left; font-size: 100%; width: 75%;
| header = North America Leg 4
| content = 
"Kick the Dust Up"
"All My Friends Say"
"Kiss Tomorrow Goodbye"
"Roller Coaster"
"Play It Again"
"Crash My Party"
"Games"
"Someone Else Calling You Baby"
"This Is How We Roll"
"Do I"
"Drink a Beer"
"Drunk on You"
"Rain Is a Good Thing"
"I See You"
"I Don't Want This Night to End"
Encore
"That's My Kind of Night"
"Country Girl (Shake It For Me)"

Source:
}}

Tour dates

List of festivals and fairs
 This concert was a part of the Great Jones Fair.
 This concert was a part of the C2C: Country to Country country music festival.

Notes:
Due to stage collapse the Lexington, Kentucky show was moved from January 17, 2014 to February 21. 
Due inclement weather the Greensboro, North Carolina show was moved from February 13 to February 17.

Critical reception
Tara Toro of Got Country Online says, "Whether you like his music or not, there is no denying, Luke is an entertainer with a capital "E". And gave 200% for the hour and a half he was on stage. The only song that really didn't go over well with the crowd was the combo of "Mukalee Creek Water"/"Drinkin' Beer and Wastin Bullets."

References

External links

2014 concert tours
2015 concert tours
Luke Bryan concert tours